The davul, dhol, tapan, atabal or tabl is a large double-headed drum that is played with mallets. It has many names depending on the country and region. These drums are commonly used in the music of the Middle East and the Balkans. These drums have both a deep bass sound and a thin treble sound due to their construction and playing style, where different heads and sticks are used to produce different sounds on the same drum.

Names
Some names of davuls include:

dhol
dawola/davola
dohol
doli
davul
dahol
davil
davula (Sinhala: දවුල)
tupan (Goranian: tupan)
daul, tǎpan, tupan
goč, tapan, tupan
tapan, tupan
tobă/dobă
tabl ( or tabl baladi)
tof
daouli
lodra, tupana, daulle, taborre
moldvai dob
Other Greek names for this drum include Davouli, Argano, Toskani, Tsokani, Toubi, Toubaki, Kiossi, Tavouli, Pavouli, Toubano, and Toubaneli.

Traditional uses
In the southern Balkans, the rhythm of the tapan is complex and utilizes many accents in numerous traditional time signatures. In Macedonia, tapans are most often used to accompany other instruments such as the zurla and gaida, while in Bulgaria they usually accompany gaida and gadulka. They are also played solo in some Albanian, Bulgarian and Macedonian folk dances and songs. For centuries the tapan is irreplaceable at Bulgarian village festivities such as weddings and celebrations of patron saints of homes and villages. In Romania and Moldova the toba is sometimes used to accompany dances. In the regions of Moldavia, Maramures and Bihor there are also some varieties with a small cymbal mounted on top. They are generally struck with a wooden mallet on one skin and with a thinner stick on the rim or cymbal.

In Armenia, Turkey, and Azerbaijan, the dhol/davul is most commonly played with the zurna, a wind instrument, although it can be played with other instruments and in ensembles as well. It has also traditionally been used for communication and for Turkish mehter, or janissary music. In Iraq and the Levant, it is predominantly used in Assyrian folk dance and Assyrian folk/pop music, among Assyrian people, which are mostly accompanied by a zurna. In Armenia, the dhol does not have as large of a circumference and is usually played with the hands, although a wooden, spoon-shaped drumstick is also used sometimes. Not only is it in folk music but also in modern music as well, even having solos in many prominent songs.

Construction

The drum shell is made of hard wood, perhaps walnut or chestnut, though many woods may be in use depending on the region where the drum is made.  To make the shell, the wood is boiled in water to make it bendable, and then it is bent into a cylindrical shape and fastened together.  The heads are usually goat skin, and they are shaped into circles by wooden frames. However, one head may be goat skin to provide a higher tone, while the other head can be sheepskin, calfskin, or even donkey-skin to provide a lower tone.  Some say that wolf skin and even dog skin are preferred. Rope threaded back and forth across the shell of the drum, from head to head in a zigzag pattern, holds the heads on the drum and provides tension for tuning the drum. Sometimes metal rings or leather straps join neighboring strands of the rope in order to allow for further tuning. Two rings are sometimes attached to the main rope where a belt-like rope is threaded through to hold the drum.

In Turkey, davuls typically range in size from 60 cm to 90 cm in diameter. Cow hide is used for the bass pitch drum head side, while goat skin is used for the thin, high pitched side.

In Greece, daouli can be 12 to 14 inches for the toumbi up to 3 to 4 feet for daouli.  Commonly the drum is about 20 to 30 inches.

Playing style
Players often use a rope hooked to the drum to hold the drum sideways, so that one head is accessible with the left hand and one with the right. Each hand is usually dedicated to playing one side of the drum exclusively, though this can vary by local style and tradition.

Drummers of this drum typically uses two kinds of sticks. This stick is a thick pipe-like stick about 440 mm long, which is often made with walnut. Its thick shape as well as the thickness of the head give the accented beats a low, full sound. Sometimes the drumhead played with the thick stick is also muted with a cloth to enhance the fundamental low note of the drum. This thin stick is often held cross-grip, and the drummer can quickly hit thin accent strokes by gently twisting the wrist. These thin sticks are often made from soft wood such as willow or cornel.

The Balkan school of tapan playing presumes the playing (not the accompaniment) of a melody, where the non-dominant hand is used to express all that the player wishes to say, while the dominant hand is only used to accentuate certain moments in the melody.

See also

Bendir
Daf
Dhol
Mazhar
Nagara (drum)
Riq
Tar (drum)
Timpani

References

External links

Discover Turkey information page on davul with sound clips
History of the Davul, from ancient times until the 18th century; in German: Janissary instruments and Europe
Greek musical instruments
Serbian musical instruments
Pontic Daouli

Drums
Battle drums
Unpitched percussion instruments
Armenian musical instruments
Assyrian music
Middle Eastern culture
Albanian musical instruments
Turkish musical instruments
Arabic musical instruments
Azerbaijani musical instruments
Kurdish musical instruments
Serbian musical instruments
Slovenian musical instruments
Hungarian musical instruments
Belarusian musical instruments
Bulgarian musical instruments
Bosnian musical instruments
Czech musical instruments
Romanian musical instruments
Moldovan musical instruments
Turkmen musical instruments
Syrian musical instruments
Persian musical instruments
Macedonian musical instruments
Montenegrin musical instruments
Pontic Greek musical instruments